Karen Lord (born 13 March 1970) is an Australian swimmer. She competed in two events at the 1988 Summer Olympics.

References

External links
 

1970 births
Living people
Australian female backstroke swimmers
Olympic swimmers of Australia
Swimmers at the 1988 Summer Olympics
Place of birth missing (living people)
Commonwealth Games medallists in swimming
Commonwealth Games bronze medallists for Australia
Swimmers at the 1990 Commonwealth Games
20th-century Australian women
Medallists at the 1990 Commonwealth Games